Labeobarbus sandersi is a species of ray-finned fish in the genus Labeobarbus is found from southern Cameroon to the Chiloango River in Cabinda.

References 

sandersi
Taxa named by George Albert Boulenger
Fish described in 1912